Ying Qianli (11 November 1900 – 8 October 1969), also known as Ying Jiliang, was a Manchu Bannerman, a prominent Catholic layman who devoted himself to education. He was proficient in English, French, Spanish and Latin.

Biography
Ying was born in Beijing on November 11, 1900, to Ying Lianzhi, founder of Ta Kung Pao and Fu Jen Catholic University, and Aisin Gioro Shuzhong, a member of the Qing dynasty royal family. At the age of 14, Ying was taken to the United Kingdom by Roman Catholic missionary Frédéric-Vincent Lebbe. After graduating from University of London in 1924 he returned to China, he helped his father to establish the Fu Jen Catholic University, where he was a professor since 1927.

During the Second Sino-Japanese War, after the fall of Beijing, Ying and Shen Jianshi secretly founded the Yanwu Society, an Anti-Japanese and national salvation organization which propagandized the idea of resisting Japan and saving the country among young people. He was arrested two times by the Japanese authorities. He was first sentenced to death and later to life imprisonment, which was finally reduced to 15 years of imprisonment. In 1945, Ying was released before the surrender of Japan. At the end of 1948, after receipt of the notice, Ying went to Taiwan with Hu Shih by an assignment plane.

Ying became vice-president of Fu Jen Catholic University. His students included Zheng Peikai, Zhang Xiuya, Gao Tian'en, Han Gongzhen, and Ma Ying-jeou. On October 8, 1969, Ying died of lung cancer at Cardinal Tien Hospital, in Taipei, Taiwan.

Personal life

Ying married Cai Baozhen, daughter of educator and politician Cai Rukai. The couple had nine children, they children were, in order of birth: Ying Qianxiang (died prematurely), Ying Ruojing (died prematurely), Ying Ruocheng, Ying Ruocong, Ying Ruocai, Ying Ruoshi, Ying Ruozhi and Ying Ruoxian.

His son Ying Ruocheng was a prominent actor after 1949 and vice minister of culture from 1986 to 1990. His son Ying ruocong is an architect. His daughter Ying Ruocai is a former basketball player. His son Ying Ruoshi was a painter. His son Ying Ruozhi is a hydraulician. His daughter Ying Ruoxian is a professor at Columbia University.

His grandsons Ying Da, Ying Zhuang and Ying Ning are well-known actor, director. His granddaughter Ying Xiaole is a Chinese-American painter. And his great-grandson Ying Rudi is a professional ice hockey player.

Work
 Logic

References

External links

 Legendary Ying Family on ifeng.com  

1900 births
1969 deaths
Educators from Beijing
Writers from Beijing
Chinese Roman Catholics
Manchu people
Chinese literary theorists